Latrell Scott (born July 17, 1975) is an American football coach.  He is currently an assistant coach at East Carolina. He was previously the head football coach of Norfolk State University, a position he held from 2015 through 2020 season that was canceled due to COVID-19 concerns.  Scott served as the head football coach at the University of Richmond in 2010 and a Virginia State University from 2013 to 2014.

Scott grew up in the Richmond, Virginia area and attended Mechanicsville High School.

Early on, Scott served as the wide receivers coach at several schools, including the University of Virginia, the University of Tennessee, Richmond, Virginia Military Institute (VMI), and Western Carolina University.  He also served as an assistant coach at Fork Union Military Academy. Scott was named head coach of the University of Richmond on December 15, 2009, replacing Mike London.

At 34 years old, Scott was the youngest head coach in NCAA Division I football at the time of his hiring. Scott resigned from his coaching duties at the University of Richmond on August 23, 2011 after being charged with driving while intoxicated.  Scott's resignation came just a week before the team's first game of the season.

On April 6, 2012 Scott was hired by Mickey Matthews as tight ends coach at James Madison University of the Colonial Athletic Association. On January 14, 2013, Scott was introduced as the 23rd all-time head coach at Virginia State University.

Head coaching record

References

External links
 Norfolk State profile
 Virginia State profile
 

1975 births
Living people
American football tight ends
Hampton Pirates football players
James Madison Dukes football coaches
Richmond Spiders football coaches
Tennessee Volunteers football coaches
Virginia Cavaliers football coaches
Virginia State Trojans football coaches
VMI Keydets football coaches
Western Carolina Catamounts football coaches
High school football coaches in Virginia
People from Mechanicsville, Virginia
Sportspeople from Richmond, Virginia
Coaches of American football from Virginia
Players of American football from Richmond, Virginia
African-American coaches of American football
African-American players of American football
20th-century African-American sportspeople
21st-century African-American sportspeople